Harmeet Singh  may refer to:

 Harmeet Singh (footballer) (born 1990), Norwegian international footballer of Indian descent who plays for Kalmar FF
 Harmeet Singh (cricketer born 1987), Indian cricketer, playing for Punjab cricket team and Kings XI Punjab
 Harmeet Singh (cricketer born 1992), Indian cricketer, playing for India Under-19 cricket team and Rajasthan Royals
 Harmeet Singh Sooden, Canadian and New Zealand citizen who volunteered for Christian Peacemaker Teams in Iraq